May Death Never Stop You (or May Death Never Stop You: The Greatest Hits 2001–2013)  is the first greatest hits compilation album by My Chemical Romance, spanning the band's entire career up to that point. It is the only album to feature keyboardist James Dewees as an official member of the band, playing on the album's lead single, "Fake Your Death."

Background 
On March 22, 2013, My Chemical Romance announced their break-up on their official website, issuing this statement:

Gerard Way posted an extended tweet on his Twitter account two days after the website announcement, where he confirmed the disbanding of the group but denied that altercations between band members was the reason for the split.

On March 25, 2014, the band released May Death Never Stop You: The Greatest Hits 2001–2013, a greatest hits album containing material spanning their entire career, as well as some previously unreleased material.

On November 29th 2013, Way posted a picture of the completed album cover on his Twitter account. On the same platform and date, Way subsequently responded to a fan's inquiry about the cover's depiction and mentioned that the statue depicted on the album cover is a composite of all the faces of My Chemical Romance band members. In addition, the statue features many references to the band's history, including bullet holes reminiscing I Brought You My Bullets, You Brought Me Your Love and the uniform jacket referring to The Black Parade.

Release 
May Death Never Stop You was released on March 25, 2014. Pre-orders became available through My Chemical Romance's official website on January 21, 2014. The unreleased track "Fake Your Death" was premiered on BBC Radio 1 on February 17, 2014, and was then available digitally via iTunes straight after.

Track listing

Personnel 
Band members
 Bob Bryar – drums, percussion (on tracks 8–12)
 James Dewees – keyboards (on track 1)
 Frank Iero – guitars, backing vocals (on tracks 1–2, 4–16)
 Matt Pelissier – drums, percussion (on tracks 2–7, 17–19)
 Ray Toro – guitars, backing vocals; bass guitar (on track 9)
 Gerard Way – lead vocals 
 Mikey Way – bass guitar

Additional musicians
 Jarrod Alexander – drums, percussion (on track 1)
 John Miceli – drums, percussion (on tracks 13–16)
 Rob Cavallo – acoustic piano (on tracks 8–12)
 Howard Benson – 1958 Hammond B3 (on tracks 4–7)
 Jamie Muhoberac – keyboards (on tracks 8–16); B3 organ, synthesizers, Wurlitzer (on tracks 8–12)
 Bert McCracken – additional vocals (on track 5)
 Renat – additional vocals (on track 7) 
 Liza Minnelli – additional vocals (on track 10)

Production
Ted Jensen at Sterling Sound, NYC – mastering

Charts

Certifications

References

External links

May Death Never Stop You at YouTube (streamed copy where licensed)

2014 greatest hits albums
My Chemical Romance compilation albums
Reprise Records compilation albums